Spanish Creek is a creek in eastern British Columbia, Canada. It flows north into the Cariboo River southwest of Cariboo Lake.

Campground
Spanish Creek Campground is on Highway 70 just east of the Highway 89 intersection; just east of where Banish Creek and Indian Creek merge to create the east branch of the North Fork Feather River. The campground is right on Spanish Creek with a very popular swimming hole. Although the campground has been upgraded, it still holds the charm that it did in years past. 
This campground is in the Plumas National Forest, which is perfect for outdoor enthusiasts because of its many streams and lakes, beautiful deep canyons, mountain valleys, meadows, and lofty peaks. Spanish Creek is in the Feather River Canyon, at an elevation of 2,000 feet.
In the Plumas National Forest, Spanish Creek campground is just a few miles from Indian Falls. Some have said that the mist created by the falls resembles a feather, thus the name Feather River. Just southeast on Highway 70 from Spanish Creek Campground is the quaint high Sierra town of Quincy. Close to the campground is the Butterfly Valley Botanical Area. The amenities of this campground include, handicap access, drinking water, fishing, river access, paved roads, swimming, tables, vault toilets, and waterfront sites.

References

Rivers of British Columbia
Cariboo Land District